Deh Mirahmad (also Romanized as Deh Mīraḩmad; also known as Deh Mīreh) is a village in Zalu Ab Rural District, in the Central District of Ravansar County, Kermanshah Province, Iran. At the 2006 census, its population was 114, in 22 families.

References 

Populated places in Ravansar County